DYLS (97.1 FM), formerly known as MOR 97.1 Lupig Sila!, was a radio station owned and operated by ABS-CBN Corporation. The station's studio and offices were located at the ABS-CBN Broadcasting Complex, North Road, Jagobiao, Mandaue, while its transmitter was located at Babag 2, Brgy. Busay, Cebu City. The frequency is currently used by Jimalalud-based Radyo Bandera.

History

1992-1994: The Great Romance
The station was established on January 20, 1992, as LS 97.1 with the tagline The Great Romance. It aired an easy listening format, similar to its Manila station. At that time, it was formerly owned by AMCARA Broadcasting Network.

1994-1997: Star Radio
On October 1, 1994, the station was reformatted as Star Radio 97.1, based from the branding its Cagayan de Oro station adopted one year prior. It carried a mass-based format. In July 1996, ABS-CBN acquired the station from AMCARA.

1997-2001: ABS-CBN Radio
On March 1, 1997, following the formation of Regional Network Group (RNG), the station was rebranded as ABS-CBN Radio LS97 with the taglines "Lupig Sila!" and "For Life!" (which was later adapted by the Manila station a year later). A few months later, a RRC-PSRC Survey shows 97.1 spotted the market so that they can make it to top 1 in the city.  On February 8, 1999, it was later changed its name to ABS-CBN LS 97.1 For Life!.

2001-2020: MOR 97.1

On July 14, 2001, as part of rebranding ABS-CBN's RNG FM stations coinciding with the Cagayan de Oro station's 8th Anniversary, the station was rebranded as MOR 97.1 Lupig Sila! For Life!. According to Nielsen and Kantar Media Survey, MOR is the Number 1 Radio Station in Metro Cebu for the last quarter of 2011.

On July 30, 2016, the station celebrated its 20th Anniversary with a tagline, "#20MakaHAPPY". At the same year, MOR 97.1 Cebu is considered to being the Official Number 1 Radio station in Metro Cebu based on Kantar Media Surveys with the audience share of 27.20% during the 1st Quarter of FY 2016.

On June 1, 2017, TV Patrol Central Visayas began airing on the station alongside sister station DYAB Radyo Patrol, becoming the first regional MOR station to do such.

On June 1, 2019, the station, along with MOR Manila and MOR Baguio, is available on Sky Cable.

2020-present: Shutdown
On May 5, 2020, the station, along with the other My Only Radio stations, went off the air due to the cease and desist order of the National Telecommunications Commission as the network's legislative franchise to operate expired the day before. It currently operates as an online platform.

References

External links

DYLS-FM
Radio stations established in 1992
MOR Philippines stations
Radio stations disestablished in 2020
Defunct radio stations in the Philippines